Greenbelt Park is a park in Greenbelt, Maryland, that is managed by the National Park Service. The forested park lies approximately 10 miles (16 km) northeast of Washington, D.C., and is situated just within the Capital Beltway (which bounds the park to the northeast).  The park land was originally intended to form part of the green belt surrounding the city of Greenbelt. The southern portion was assigned to the National Park Service, thus forming the park, while another section became part of the Henry A. Wallace Beltsville Agricultural Research Center (BARC).

Recreational facilities include a 5.3 mile (8.5 km) mile hiking and equestrian trail, several shorter nature trails, numerous campsites, and three picnic areas.

The park received its National Park designation in 1950, and was acquired along with the land that would form the Baltimore-Washington Parkway, which divides the park in a roughly north–south direction. Nearly all of the park's facilities are located within the larger western portion (the eastern portion has one fire road).

References

External links 

 
 Birds of Greenbelt Park and the Baltimore–Washington Parkway at the USGS Patuxent Wildlife Research Center
 
 Greenbelt Park at the National Parks Conservation Association
 Greenbelt Park at the National Park Foundation
 NPSpecies for Greenbelt Park — Park Species List from the National Park Service
 Greenbelt Park at Recreation.gov

Protected areas of Prince George's County, Maryland
National Park Service areas in Maryland
National Capital Parks-East
Greenbelt, Maryland
Parks in Prince George's County, Maryland
Protected areas established in 1950
1950 establishments in Maryland